The BB Microlight 103 is a Hungarian ultralight trike, designed and produced by BB Microlight of Baja, Hungary. The aircraft is supplied as a complete ready-to-fly-aircraft.

Design and development
It features a cable-braced hang glider-style high-wing, weight-shift controls, a single-seat open cockpit, tricycle landing gear with wheel pants and a single engine in pusher configuration.

The aircraft is made from bolted-together aluminum tubing, with its wing covered in Dacron sailcloth. Its  span wing is supported by a single tube-type kingpost and uses an "A" frame weight-shift control bar. The powerplant is a twin cylinder, air-cooled, two-stroke, dual-ignition  Rotax 447 engine.

The carriage comes with brakes, full suspension and a cockpit fairing, but is also available in nanotrike form without the fairings.

A number of different wings can be fitted to the basic carriage, including the BB Microlight BB-03 Trya and the US-made 40% double surface Manta RST.

In the United States the aircraft is imported by Manta Aircraft and fitted with the Manta RST wing.

Specifications (103 with Manta RST 12.5 wing)

References

External links

2000s Hungarian sport aircraft
2000s Hungarian ultralight aircraft
Single-engined pusher aircraft
Ultralight trikes
BB Microlight aircraft